Climate resilience is defined as the "capacity of social, economic and ecosystems to cope with a hazardous event or trend or disturbance". This is done by "responding or reorganising in ways that maintain their essential function, identity and structure (as well as biodiversity in case of ecosystems) while also maintaining the capacity for adaptation, learning and transformation". The key focus of increasing climate resilience is to reduce the climate vulnerability that communities, states, and countries currently have with regards to the many effects of climate change. Currently, efforts to build climate resilience encompass social, economic, technological, and political strategies that are being implemented at all scales of society. From local community action to global treaties, addressing climate resilience is becoming a priority, although it could be argued that a significant amount of the theory has yet to be translated into practice. Despite this, there is a robust and ever-growing movement fueled by local and national bodies alike geared towards building and improving climate resilience.

Climate resilience is related to climate change adaptation efforts. It aims to reduce climate change vulnerability and includes considerations of climate justice and equity. Practical implementations include climate resilient infrastructure, climate resilient agriculture and climate resilient development. Most objective approaches to measuring climate resilience use fixed and transparent definitions of resilience, and allow for different groups of people to be compared through standardised metrics.

Definition
Climate resilience is generally considered to be the ability to recover from, or to mitigate vulnerability to, climate-related shocks such as floods and droughts. It is a political process that strengthens the ability of all to mitigate vulnerability to risks from, and adapt to changing patterns in, climate hazards and variability.

The IPCC Sixth Assessment Report defines climate resilience as follows: "Resilience in this report is defined as the capacity of social, economic and ecosystems to cope with a hazardous event or trend or disturbance, responding or reorganising in ways that maintain their essential function, identity and structure as well as biodiversity in case of ecosystems while also maintaining the capacity for adaptation, learning and transformation. Resilience is a positive attribute when it maintains such a capacity for adaptation, learning, and/or transformation."  

Resilience is a useful concept because it speaks across sectors and disciplines but this also makes it open to interpretation resulting in differing, and at times competing, definitions. The definition of climate resilience is heavily debated, in both conceptual and practical terms.

Related concepts

Climate change adaptation 

The fact that climate resilience encompasses a dual function, to absorb shock as well as to self-renew, is the primary means by which it can be differentiated from the concept of climate adaptation. In general, adaptation is viewed as a group of processes and actions that help a system absorb changes that have already occurred, or may be predicted to occur in the future. For the specific case of environmental change and climate adaptation, it is argued by many that adaptation should be defined strictly as encompassing only active decision-making processes and actions – in other words, deliberate changes made in response to climate change. 

Of course, this characterization is highly debatable: after all, adaptation can also be used to describe natural, involuntary processes by which organisms, populations, ecosystems and perhaps even social-ecological systems evolve after the application of certain external stresses. However, for the purposes of differentiating climate adaptation and climate resilience from a policymaking standpoint, we can contrast the active, actor-centric notion of adaptation with resilience, which would be a more systems-based approach to building social-ecological networks that are inherently capable of not only absorbing change, but utilizing those changes to develop into more efficient configurations.

Climate change vulnerability

If the definition of resiliency is the ability to recover from a negative event, in this case climate change, then talking about preparations beforehand and strategies for recovery (aka adaptations), as well as populations that are more or less capable of developing and implementing a resiliency strategy (aka vulnerable populations) are essential. This is framed under the assumed detrimental impacts of climate change to ecosystems and ecosystem services. 

It is important to note that efforts to enhance resiliency can result in outcomes that are adaptive, maladaptive, or even both. When considering inequality with adaptation we can focus on distributive justice, the intent of which is to maximize benefits for and promote the engagement of the most disadvantaged communities. Identifying a community or population as vulnerable can lead to biases due to the different factors negotiated in the term vulnerable. Outcome vulnerability (focusing on quantitative measures) and contextual vulnerability (focusing on qualitative measures) are two aspects that must be thought of in unison to achieve a wholistic understanding of a community's vulnerable state. Because one population's level of vulnerability is constantly shifting (as are the threats and impacts of climate change) the efforts to provide adaptive strategies must offer multiple opportunities and outcomes.

Components
Currently, the majority of work regarding climate resilience has focused on actions taken to maintain existing systems and structures. This largely relates to the capacity of social-ecological systems to sustain shocks and maintain the integrity of functional relationships in the face of external forces. However, there is a growing consensus in the academic literature that actions taken to induce structural changes must also be recognized within the definition of resilience. The three basic capacities that are understood under the common definition are absorptive, adaptive, and transformative, each of which contributes different factors to the efforts of resilience work. This includes the capacity of social-ecological systems to renew and develop, and to utilize disturbances as opportunities for innovation and evolution of new pathways that improve the system's ability to adapt to macroscopic changes.

Key aspects include: how resilience relates to climate change adaptation; the extent to which it should encompass actor-based versus systems-based approaches to improving stability; and its relationship with the balance of nature theory or homeostatic equilibrium view of ecological systems.

The building of climate resilience is a highly comprehensive undertaking that involves of an eclectic array of actors and agents: individuals, community organizations, micropolitical bodies, corporations, governments at local, state, and national levels as well as international organizations. In essence, actions that bolster climate resilience are ones that will enhance the adaptive capacity of social, industrial, and environmental infrastructures that can mitigate the effects of climate change. Currently, research indicates that the strongest indicator of successful climate resilience efforts at all scales is a well-developed, pre-existing network of social, political, economic and financial institutions that is already positioned to effectively take on the work of identifying and addressing the risks posed by climate change. Cities, states, and nations that have already developed such networks are, as expected, to generally have far higher net incomes and GDP.

Therefore, it can be seen that embedded within the task of building climate resilience at any scale will be the overcoming of macroscopic socioeconomic inequities: in many ways, truly facilitating the construction of climate resilient communities worldwide will require national and international agencies to address issues of global poverty, industrial development, and food justice. However, this does not mean that actions to improve climate resilience cannot be taken in real time at all levels, although evidence suggests that the most climate resilient cities and nations have accumulated this resilience through their responses to previous weather-based disasters. Perhaps even more importantly, empirical evidence suggests that the creation of the climate resilient structures is dependent upon an array of social and environmental reforms that were only successfully passed due to the presence of certain sociopolitical structures such as democracy, activist movements, and decentralization of government.

By sector

Development 
"Climate resilient development" has become the new paradigm for sustainable development influencing theory and practice across all sectors globally. This is particularly true in the water sector, since water security is intimately connected to climate change. On every continent, governments are adopting policies for climate resilient economies, driven in part by international frameworks such as the Paris Agreement and the Sustainable Development Goals.

Climate resilient development "integrates adaptation measures and their enabling conditions with mitigation to advance sustainable development for all". It involves questions of equity and system transitions, and includes adaptations for human, ecosystem and planetary health. Climate resilient development is facilitated by developing partnerships with traditionally marginalised groups, including women, youth, Indigenous Peoples, local communities and ethnic minorities.

To achieve climate resilient development, the following actions are needed: increasing climate information, and financing and technical capacity for flexible and dynamic systems. This needs to be coupled with greater consideration of the socio-ecological resilience and context-specific values of marginalised communities and meaningful engagement with the most vulnerable in decision making.

Infrastructure 
Infrastructure failures can have broad-reaching consequences extending away from the site of the original event, and for a considerable duration after the immediate failure. Furthermore, increasing reliance infrastructure system interdependence, in combination with the effects of climate change and population growth all contribute to increasing vulnerability and exposure, and greater probability of catastrophic failures.  To reduce this vulnerability, and in recognition of limited resources and future uncertainty about climate projections, new and existing long-lasting infrastructure must undergo a risk-based engineering and economic analyses to properly allocate resources and design for climate resilience.

Incorporating climate projections into building and infrastructure design standards, investment and appraisal criteria, and model building codes is currently not common.  Some resilience guidelines and risk-informed frameworks have been developed by public entities. Such manuals can offer guidance for adaptive design methods, characterization of extremes, development of flood design criteria, flood load calculation and the application of adaptive risk management principals account for more severe climate/weather extremes. One example is the "Climate Resiliency Design Guidelines" by New York City.

Agriculture

Water and sanitation

Tools

Climate resilience framework 

A climate resilience framework can better equip governments and policymakers to develop sustainable solutions that combat the effects of climate change. To begin with, climate resilience establishes the idea of multi-stable socio-ecological systems (socio-ecological systems can actually stabilize around a multitude of possible states). Secondly, climate resilience has played a critical role in emphasizing the importance of preventive action when assessing the effects of climate change. Although adaptation is always going to be a key consideration, making changes after the fact has a limited capability to help communities and nations deal with climate change. By working to build climate resilience, policymakers and governments can take a more comprehensive stance that works to mitigate the harms of climate change impacts before they happen. Finally, a climate resilience perspective encourages greater cross-scale connectedness of systems. Creating mechanisms of adaptation that occur in isolation at local, state, or national levels may leave the overall social-ecological system vulnerable. A resilience-based framework would require far more cross-talk, and the creation of environmental protections that are more holistically generated and implemented.

One weakness of centralized organisations is their lack of adaptation to climate change issues specific to territories. To overcome it, a new concept called the "mistletoe ball" society (la société "boule de gui" in French) is emerging. States can provide resources (financial, empowerment, skills) to territories so they can provide a safety net to inhabitants, companies and public organizations. In addition, each territory is linked to each other through cooperation and solidarity ties. This safety net encompasses access to energy, food, mobility, health and education, among others. It doesn't provide full services but minimum services to survive the time needed to come back to a better situation. Compared to a full autonomous territory, it brings more resilience because a territory can be overwhelmed by a natural disaster and so needs help from other areas that are not affected. In addition, it needs less resources to create a safety net rather than a full autonomous system.

Disaster preparedness protocols 

At larger governmental levels, general programs to improve climate resiliency through greater disaster preparedness are being implemented. For example, in cases such as Norway, this includes the development of more sensitive and far-reaching early warning systems for extreme weather events, creation of emergency electricity power sources, enhanced public transportation systems, and more.

Measurements 
Governments and development agencies are spending increasing amounts of finance to support resilience-building interventions. Resilience measurement can make valuable contributions in guiding resource allocations towards resilience-building. This includes targeted identification of vulnerability hotspots, a better understanding of the drivers of resilience, and tools to infer the impact and effectiveness of resilience-building interventions. In recent years, a large number of resilience measurement tools have emerged, offering ways to track and measure resilience at a range of scales - from individuals and households to communities and nations.

Efforts to measure climate resilience currently face several technical challenges. Firstly, the definition of resilience is heavily contested, making it difficult to choose appropriate characteristics and indicators to track. Secondly, the resilience or households or communities cannot be measured using a single observable metric. Resilience is made up of a range of processes and characteristics, many of which are intangible and difficult to observe (such as social capital). As a result, many resilience toolkits resort to using large lists of proxy indicators.

Most of the recent initiatives to measure resilience in rural development contexts share two shortcomings: complexity and high cost. USAID published a field guide for assessing climate resilience in smallholder supply chains.

Most objective approaches use fixed and transparent definitions of resilience and allow for different groups of people to be compared through standardized metrics. However, as many resilience processes and capacities are intangible, objective approaches are heavily reliant on crude proxies. Examples of commonly used objective measures include the Resilience Index Measurement and Analysis (RIMA) and the Livelihoods Change Over Time (LCOT).

Subjective approaches to resilience measurement take a contrasting view. They assume that people have a valid understanding of their resilience and seek to factor perceptions into the measurement process. They challenge the notion that experts are best placed to evaluate other people's lives. Subjective approaches use people's menu of what constitutes resilience and allow them to self-evaluate accordingly. An example is the Subjectively-Evaluated Resilience Score (SERS)

History 
The theoretical basis for many of the ideas central to climate resilience have actually existed since the 1960s. Originally an idea defined for strictly ecological systems, resilience in ecology was initially outlined by C.S. Holling as the capacity for ecological systems and relationships within those systems to persist and absorb changes to "state variables, driving variables, and parameters." This definition helped form the foundation for the notion of ecological equilibrium: the idea that the behavior of natural ecosystems is dictated by a homeostatic drive towards some stable set point. Under this school of thought (which maintained quite a dominant status during this time period), ecosystems were perceived to respond to disturbances largely through negative feedback systems – if there is a change, the ecosystem would act to mitigate that change as much as possible and attempt to return to its prior state. 

As greater amounts of scientific research in ecological adaptation and natural resource management was conducted, it became clear that oftentimes, natural systems were subjected to dynamic, transient behaviors that changed how they reacted to significant changes in state variables: rather than work back towards a predetermined equilibrium, the absorbed change was harnessed to establish a new baseline to operate under. Rather than minimize imposed changes, ecosystems could integrate and manage those changes, and use them to fuel the evolution of novel characteristics. This new perspective of resilience as a concept that inherently works synergistically with elements of uncertainty and entropy first began to facilitate changes in the field of adaptive management and environmental resources, through work whose basis was built by Holling and colleagues yet again.

By the mid 1970s, resilience began gaining momentum as an idea in anthropology, culture theory, and other social sciences. There was significant work in these relatively non-traditional fields that helped facilitate the evolution of the resilience perspective as a whole. Part of the reason resilience began moving away from an equilibrium-centric view and towards a more flexible, malleable description of social-ecological systems was due to work such as that of Andrew Vayda and Bonnie McCay in the field of social anthropology, where more modern versions of resilience were deployed to challenge traditional ideals of cultural dynamics.

Eventually by the late 1980s and early 1990s, resilience had fundamentally changed as a theoretical framework. Not only was it now applicable to social-ecological systems, but more importantly, resilience now incorporated and emphasized ideas of management, integration, and utilization of change rather than simply describing reactions to change. Resilience was no longer just about absorbing shocks, but also about harnessing the changes triggered by external stresses to catalyze the evolution the social-ecological system in question.

See also
Ecological resilience
Resilience in the built environment

References

Ecology terminology
Environmental impact of agriculture
Environmental justice
Climate change mitigation